The Cloud Credential Council (CCC)  is a non-profit association, issuing professional certifications for the information technology (IT) industry. The company has been a global provider of vendor-neutral certification programs since its establishment. Its certifications have been delivered in over 75 countries across all types of industries and governmental agencies.

History

The CCC was founded in 2013 as a result of a cloud competence development program in ING. Organizations including HP, VMware, Virtual Clarity, IBM, and Cisco supported the creation of a training program that resulted in training over 2000 people within ING in a period of just over 6 months.
The CCC was established as an outcome of this program. ING realized that with a formal certification it would be able to both validate the skills of its professionals, but also help employees in enhancing their career. Professional certification body CompTIA also signed on to this initiative, and Cloud Essentials became the first vendor-neutral cloud certification in the market.

Overview

The CCC issues formal certificates to IT and business professionals. Its portfolio includes foundation level programs on Cloud, IoT, Big Data and Blockchain, and Professional role-based certifications for Cloud. The CCC works with over 200 registered training providers across the world to deliver in-class or virtual CCC training programs. It also works with EXIN, an internationally renowned certification and accreditation organization for the delivery of exams.

Certifications
 Big Data Foundation
 Blockchain Foundation
 Cloud Computing Technology Associate
 Cloud Computing Technology Associate+
 IoT Foundation
 Professional Cloud Administrator
 Professional Cloud Developer
 Professional Cloud Security Manager
 Professional Cloud Service Manager
 Professional Cloud Solutions Architect

See also
List of computer security certifications

References

External links

 

Companies based in Rotterdam
Organizations established in 2013